Helge Engelke is a German guitar player, composer, and producer most celebrated for his guitar work in the hard rock bands Fair Warning and Dreamtide. He has also employed his considerable guitar talents in acclaimed "studio work" and has guested on various artists' albums/CDs including vocals and guitars for his friend Zeno Roth. Herr Engelke was born on 24 September 1961 in Hanover, Germany. He currently resides in Altenhorst, Niedersachsen, Germany.

Helge started playing guitar at the age of 13 and soon became obsessed with the instrument and music in general. To quote Engelke, "I listened to everything that was around. From Yes to Genesis, from T Rex to Mott the Hoople, from Deep Purple to Led Zeppelin. My favorite band was - and in some concerns still is - Rainbow. I really liked the mixture of heavy rock guitars with strong vocal melodies and powerful drums." The young musician was a fan of both Uli Jon Roth (then Ulrich Roth) and Michael Schenker so his early guitar preferences were the Fender Stratocaster and the Gibson Flying V.

In 1996, Engelke was in a car accident breaking both arms. It took him approximately five months to recover and regain his playing skills, delaying the recording and mixing of Fair Warning's "Live and More".

On 11 August 2012 Helge married long time girlfriend Olatz Ibarlucea in Llodio, Pais Vasco, Spain.

Brief history: Fair Warning, Dreamtide
Fair Warning originated in 1990, rising from the ashes of a band called Zeno. They were masterful with their first demo and were immediately signed to WEA worldwide. In the year 2000, Andy Malecek left the group (April) followed by Tommy Heart (August) effectively breaking up the band. Fair Warning reunited in the summer of 2005 and is still active. The band recently recorded a new album, "Sundancer", which was released on 24 April 2013 in Japan. The CD was released in The United States in June 2013.

Engelke formed Dreamtide in 2001 with then former FW drummer, C.C. Behrens. The band was rounded out with Olaf Senkbeil (vocals), Ole Hempelmann (bass), and Torsten Luederwaldt (keyboards). Francis Buchholz (Scorpions) replaced Hempelmann for the 3rd album. Dreamtide is still active.

Other activity
In 2011, Engelke was instrumental in the production of German band NITRO GODS eponymous first studio album. In 2014, he co-wrote and co-produced "Unbroken", a new album from Hannover-based band THOMSEN.

Discography 
Fair Warning
 1992 - Fair Warning
 1993 - Live in Japan (Live)
 1995 - Rainmaker
 1995 - Live at Home (Live)
 1997 - Go!
 1998 - Live and More (Live)
 2000 - Four
 2006 - Brother's Keeper
 2009 - Aura
 2010 - Talking Ain't Enough (Live)
 2010 - Talking Ain't Enough (DVD))
 2012 - Best and More
 2012 - Save Me (Single)
 2013 - Sundancer
 2016 - Pimp your Past
 2019 - Two Nights to Remember'' (2CDs + DVD)

Dreamtide
 2001 - Here Comes the Flood
 2003 - Dreams For the Daring
 2008 - Dream and Deliver
 2022 - Drama Dust Dream
Other appearances
 1992 - Letter X “Born into darkness”
 1992 - Inspiration “Anyway”
 1992 - Victory “You Bought It You Name It”
 1992 - Simone “Sometimes”
 1992 - Simone “Passenger” single
 1993 - Mind odyssey “Keep it all turning”
 1993 - V.A.N.
 1994 - Eloy “Destination”
 1995 - Zeno “Zenology”
 1998 - Karel Gott “Für Immer Jung”
 2002 - Ralph Santolla “Shaolin Monks in the Temple of Metal”
 2002 - Lana Lane “Project Sangri-la”
 2005 - UFO “Showtime” DVD
 2011 - HELP!
 2011 - Nitrogods "Nitrogods"
 2014 - Thomsen - "Unbroken"

References

External links
 
 Fair-warning.de

1961 births
Living people
German guitarists
German rock guitarists
German male guitarists
Musicians from Hanover